Colm Moriarty (born 12 June 1979) is an Irish professional golfer.

Moriarty was born in Dublin. He turned professional in 2003, after playing in the victorious Great Britain and Ireland Walker Cup team. He has competed mostly on lower level tours, qualifying for his first full season on the second tier Challenge Tour in 2005. In 2007 he recorded wins on both the Challenge Tour, at the FIRSTPLUS Wales Challenge, and the third tier PGA EuroPro Tour, at the Wensum Valley International Open. In July 2010, he led local final qualifying at Kingsbairn for his first major, the 2010 Open Championship at St Andrews, where he made the cut and finished tied 37th.

Amateur wins
2003 New South Wales Medal, New South Wales Amateur Championship

Professional wins (2)

Challenge Tour wins (1)

*Note: The 2007 FIRSTPLUS Wales Challenge was shortened to 54 holes due to weather.

PGA EuroPro Tour wins (1)

Results in major championships

Note: Moriarty only played in The Open Championship.
"T" = tied

Team appearances
Amateur
Eisenhower Trophy (representing Ireland): 2002
Walker Cup (representing Great Britain & Ireland): 2003 (winners)
European Amateur Team Championship (representing Ireland): 2005

References

External links

Irish male golfers
European Tour golfers
Sportspeople from Dublin (city)
Sportspeople from County Westmeath
People from Athlone
1979 births
Living people